No Goats, No Glory is the second album by the American hip hop group the Goats, released in 1994 through Ruffhouse Records. It was the group's final studio album.

Production
The album was produced by the Goats and Joe "The Butcher" Nicolo. Oatie Kato had left the group; Madd and Swayzack recorded the album as a duo, incorporating more of a live band sound. Compared to the debut, the album contained fewer lyrics that dealt with politics, instead embracing "gangster" and party themes.

Critical reception
Entertainment Weekly wrote: "Musically fluid and lyrically poetic, choice cuts like 'Lincoln Drive' exemplify these Philadelphians’ punk-funk sound." Robert Christgau singled out "Butcher Countdown" for praise. The Washington Post thought that "because they're following the trend toward softer, jazzier beats, most of the album has little urgency." Rolling Stone opined that "the athletic scratching and murky, bass-heavy rumble of 'Mutiny' recall prime Eric B. and Rakim jams."

AllMusic thought that "for a perfect example of the hip-hop slide—the notion that an artist's sophomore effort is vastly inferior to the debut—start here."

Track listing
"Wake 'N' Bake"- 4:24  
"Philly Blunts"- 4:04  
"The Boom"- 3:47  
"Lincoln Drive"- 4:16  
"Butcher Countdown"- 0:57  
"Mutiny"- 4:30  
"Rumblefish"- 3:01  
"Blind with Anger"- 3:49  
"Revolution 94"- 8:24  
"Times Runnin Up"- 2:50  
"Idiot Business- 6:33

References

1994 albums
Ruffhouse Records albums
Columbia Records albums